Alexandra Maria Catherine Colen (born 9 July 1955) is a Belgian politician. She was member of the Belgian Chamber of Representatives for the Vlaams Belang party from 21 May 1995 until May 2014. She holds a PhD in linguistics, and is known for her advocacy of strict Catholic ethics.

She is married to Paul Beliën, the editor of the conservative-libertarian blog The Brussels Journal.

Within the Vlaams Blok and its successor party Vlaams Belang, Colen is seen as a leading voice of the religious conservative (essentially Catholic) wing of the party, even holding prayer sessions within the parliament building together with other Vlaams Belang representatives such as Tanguy Veys. She is an advocate of Flemish independence, free trade and is an opponent of abortion, euthanasia and LGBT rights. In 1997-1998 she was a major force in protesting images and text encouraging sexual arousal of infants in a text book used for catechism.

Re-elected as second candidate on the Antwerp Vlaams Belang list in 1995, 2003, and 2007, she was lijstduwer in 2010 but managed to get re-elected.
Colen quit Vlaams Belang in 2013 and remained an independent member of the Chamber until the end of the legislative period in 2014.

References 

Vlaams Belang politicians
Members of the Belgian Federal Parliament
Belgian academics
Belgian anti-abortion activists
Belgian Roman Catholics
Living people
1955 births
Irish emigrants to Belgium
21st-century Belgian women politicians
21st-century Belgian politicians
Religious controversies in Belgium